Simon Francis Sheldon-Collins (born 4 July 1967 in Melbourne, Victoria) is an Australian baseball pitcher. He represented Australia at the 1996 Summer Olympics alongside his brother Matthew Sheldon-Collins.

References

External links
 
 
 

1967 births
Living people
Australian baseball players
Olympic baseball players of Australia
Baseball players at the 1996 Summer Olympics
Sportspeople from Melbourne